Golubovci is a small town in the Podgorica Municipality of Montenegro. 

It has 3,110 residents according to 2011 census, while the Golubovci City Municipality accounts for some 16,093 residents.

Transport
Sometimes Podgorica Airport is referred as to Golubovci Airport by locals, the airport being just 5 km away from the town.

Golubovci is located next to the M-2, Podgorica - Bar road (E65/E80), main Montenegrin road connection between the coast and northern part of the country. Part of this road went through the centre of Golubovci causing frequent traffic jams during the summer tourist season which led to construction of 4-lane dual carriageway, the Golubovci Bypass, in 2018.

Sports
The town is home to FK Zeta, one of the most successful Montenegrin football clubs in recent years. They play their home games at the Stadion Trešnjica. The town's basketball team is KK Zeta 2011.

Ethnic composition

Town (2011) 
Montenegrins - 1,920 (61.7%)
Serbs - 844 (27,4%)
No response - 265(8.5%)
Others 81 (2.6%)
Total - 3,110

Municipality (2011)
Montenegrins - 10,574 (65.15%)
Serbs - 4,190 (25.81%)
Others/unspecified - 1,467 (9.04%)
Total - 16,093

City Municipality
Town of Golubovci is the seat of the Golubovci City Municipality (Montenegrin: Gradska opština Golubovci / Градска општина Голубовци), a subdivision of the Podgorica Capital City. The town is located some 15 km south of the city of Podgorica, in the fertile Zeta Plain (Zetska ravnica).

Gallery

References 

Populated places in Podgorica Municipality